Beckmannia is a small genus of grasses containing two species known generally as sloughgrass. Beckmannia eruciformis is a Eurasian perennial, and Beckmannia syzigachne is an annual grass found in North America and Asia. The genus was named for the German scientist Johann Beckmann.

See also
List of Poaceae genera

References

External links
Jepson Manual Treatment
Grass Manual Treatment

Pooideae
Poaceae genera